Robert "Bob" Gilstrap (born 1974) is an American former mixed martial artist who competed in the Heavyweight division. He lost the last fight of his career at AMC - Return of the Gladiators 1 against Jeff Monson on July 29, 2000.



Mixed martial arts record

|-
|Loss
|align=center|5-7
|Brandon Anderson
|TKO
|FE: Fightstorm Entertainment
|
|align=center|2
|align=center|N/A
|Sidney, Montana, United States
|
|-
|Loss
|align=center|5-6
| Jeff Monson
|Decision (unanimous)
|AMC: Return of the Gladiators 1
|
|align=center|3
|align=center|5:00
|Washington, United States
|
|-
|Loss
|align=center|5-5
|Gary Armbrust
|Decision
|WCT: Western Canada's Toughest
|
|align=center|N/A
|
|Canada
|
|-
|Loss
|align=center|5-4 
| Carlos Newton
|Submission (triangle choke)
|UFC 17
|
|align=center|1
|align=center|0:52
|Alabama, United States
|
|-
|Loss
|align=center|5-3
| Josh Barnett
|DQ (illegal strikes)
|UFCF: Night of Champions
|
|align=center|1
|align=center|0:42
|
|
|-
|Loss
|align=center|5-2
| Dario Amorim 
|Decision (unanimous)
|IVC 4: The Battle
|
|align=center|1
|align=center|30:00
|Brazil
|
|-
|Win
|align=center|5-1
| Lucas Silva de Jesus 
|TKO (submission to punches)
|IVC 4: The Battle
|
|align=center|1
|align=center|2:25
|Brazil
|
|-
|Win
|align=center|4-1
| Jason Fairn
|TKO (submission to knees)
|RC: RAW Combat
|
|align=center|N/A
|align=center|7:59
|Vancouver, British Columbia, Canada
|
|-   
|Loss
|align=center|3-1
| Josh Barnett
|Decision (unanimous)
|UFCF 2
| 
| align=center| 1
| align=center| 10:00
| Washington, United States
|
|-           
|Win
|align=center|3-0
| Lance Gibson
|TKO (rear naked choke)
|SB 4: SuperBrawl 4
|
|align=center|1
|align=center|4:53
|Hawaii, United States
|
|-
|Win
|align=center|2-0
| John Matua
|Submission (armbar)
|SB 4: SuperBrawl 4
|
|align=center|1
|align=center|4:41
|Hawaii, United States
|
|-
|Win
|align=center|1-0
| Chris Munsen
|Submission (choke)
|UFCF: Clash of the Titans
|
|align=center|1
|align=center|6:29
|
|
|-

External links
 
 
 Bob Gilstrap fighting resume at MixedMartialArts.com

1974 births
American male mixed martial artists
Mixed martial artists from Washington (state)
Heavyweight mixed martial artists
Living people
Sportspeople from Bellevue, Washington
Ultimate Fighting Championship male fighters